The thick line policy (Polish: gruba kreska, thick stroke, or gruba linia, thick line) was the term used by prime minister of Poland, Tadeusz Mazowiecki, in his first parliamentary speech in Sejm, in 1989.

He said, "We split away the history of our recent past with a thick line. We will be responsible only for what we have done to help extract Poland from her current predicament, from now on". (Przeszłość odkreślamy grubą linią. Odpowiadać będziemy jedynie za to, co uczyniliśmy, by wydobyć Polskę z obecnego stanu załamania.)

In more recent years, his intentions were considered by many people, and his gruba kreska is often understood as a policy of nonpunishment for crimes committed by the communist regime of pre-1989 Poland.

See also
 Polish Round Table Agreement
 Lustration in Poland
 Vergangenheitsbewältigung

Notes and references

Politics of Poland
Political catchphrases
1989 in Poland